UARS may refer to:

Upper Atmosphere Research Satellite, an orbital observatory whose mission was to study the Earth's atmosphere, particularly the protective ozone layer, and which crashed on Earth in 2011
Upper airway resistance syndrome, a sleep disorder characterized by airway resistance to breathing during sleep